Sebastian Giovanni Andre Tretola (born May 1, 1992) is a former American football guard. He played college football at Arkansas, Iowa Western, and Nevada.

Professional career

Tennessee Titans
Tretola was drafted by the Tennessee Titans in the sixth round, 193rd overall, in the 2016 NFL Draft.

Tretola was waived by the Titans on July 28, 2017, days after being shot in the leg.

Houston Roughnecks
On November 22, 2019, Tretola was drafted by the Houston Roughnecks in the 2020 XFL Supplemental Draft. He had his contract terminated when the league suspended operations on April 10, 2020.

Legal issues
On May 10, 2017, Tretola and teammate Tajae Sharpe were named as defendants in a federal civil Lawsuit that alleges the teammates were at a Nashville bar watching the 2017 NFL Draft. Dante R. Satterfield, the plaintiff in the lawsuit, claims he told Sharpe he'd probably lose playing time as a result of the Titans selecting wide receiver Corey Davis in the first round. The report alleges Sharpe responded by challenging him to a fight in a back alley and was accompanied by Tretola as a lookout. Satterfield claims he was knocked unconscious for 12 hours, suffered a concussion, and facial fractures from the incident and is suing for $500,000 in damages.

References

External links 
 Arkansas Razorbacks bio

1992 births
Living people
American football offensive guards
Arkansas Razorbacks football players
Iowa Western Reivers football players
Nevada Wolf Pack football players
Players of American football from California
Sportspeople from San Bernardino, California
Tennessee Titans players
Houston Roughnecks players